The 2016 World Short Track Speed Skating Championships took place from 11 to 13 March 2016 in Seoul, South Korea. They were the 41st World Short Track Speed Skating Championships.

Medal summary

Medal table

Men

Women

References

External links
ISU website
Results book

2016
World Short Track Championships
2016 World Short Track Championships
World Short Track Championships
International speed skating competitions hosted by South Korea
2010s in Seoul
2016 in South Korea